Sam Day (born 6 September 1992) is an Australian rules footballer who plays for the Gold Coast Football Club in the Australian Football League (AFL).

Early life
Day was born in Adelaide, South Australia. His grandfather Ian Day and great-uncle Robert Day both had long SANFL careers, while his uncle Tim Day represented the Australian national baseball team. Sam Day grew up playing a variety of sports and by high school he continued to play football, baseball and basketball at a high level. He attended Prince Alfred College throughout his schooling years and was forced to choose between baseball and basketball college offers in the United States or nominating for the AFL's national draft. After a strong final year with Sturt in the SANFL and an All-Australian selection at the Under 18 national championships, Day settled on football. He was selected by the Gold Coast with the third pick in the 2010 national draft. Day is cousins with Hawthorn player, Will Day.

AFL career
Day made his AFL debut for the Gold Coast Suns against the Brisbane Lions in round 7 of the 2011 season. He kicked a career high four goals against Collingwood in 2014.

In 2016, with the Suns' list severely impacted by injury, coach Rodney Eade moved Day into defence where he proved to be an effective tall defender.

Statistics
 Statistics are correct to the end of round 3, 2022

|-
|- style="background-color: #EAEAEA"
! scope="row" style="text-align:center" | 2011
|style="text-align:center;"|
| 39 || 7 || 2 || 5 || 20 || 32 || 52 || 18 || 4 || 2 || 0.3 || 0.7 || 2.9 || 4.6 || 7.4 || 2.6 || 0.6 || 0.3 || 0
|-
! scope="row" style="text-align:center" | 2012
|style="text-align:center;"|
| 12 || 15 || 10 || 10 || 56 || 65 || 121 || 46 || 16 || 16 || 0.7 || 0.7 || 3.7 || 4.3 || 8.1 || 3.1 || 1.1 || 1.1 || 0
|- style="background-color: #EAEAEA"
! scope="row" style="text-align:center" | 2013
|style="text-align:center;"|
| 12 || 20 || 12 || 8 || 112 || 93 || 205 || 72 || 35 || 36 || 0.6 || 0.4 || 5.6 || 4.7 || 10.3 || 3.6 || 1.8 || 1.8 || 0
|-
! scope="row" style="text-align:center" | 2014
|style="text-align:center;"|
| 12 || 22 || 19 || 9 || 133 || 93 || 226 || 74 || 38 || 120 || 0.9 || 0.4 || 6.0 || 4.2 || 10.3 || 3.4 || 1.7 || 5.5 || 2
|- style="background-color: #EAEAEA"
! scope="row" style="text-align:center" | 2015
|style="text-align:center;"|
| 12 || 14 || 8 || 2 || 64 || 52 || 116 || 45 || 25 || 26 || 0.6 || 0.1 || 4.6 || 3.7 || 8.3 || 3.2 || 1.8 || 1.9 || 0
|-
! scope="row" style="text-align:center" | 2016
|style="text-align:center;"|
| 12 || 20 || 14 || 12 || 127 || 103 || 230 || 88 || 55 || 26 || 0.7 || 0.6 || 6.4 || 5.2 || 11.5 || 4.4 || 2.8 || 1.3 || 1
|- style="background-color: #EAEAEA"
! scope="row" style="text-align:center" | 2017
|style="text-align:center;"|
| 12 || 0 || – || – || – || – || – || – || – || – || – || – || – || – || – || – || – || – || –
|-
! scope="row" style="text-align:center" | 2018
|style="text-align:center;"|
| 12 || 12 || 9 || 5 || 61 || 57 || 118 || 40 || 28 || 51 || 0.8 || 0.4 || 5.1 || 4.8 || 9.8 || 3.3 || 2.3 || 4.3 || 0
|- style="background-color: #EAEAEA"
! scope="row" style="text-align:center" | 2019
|style="text-align:center;"|
| 12 || 10 || 11 || 4 || 61 || 55 || 116 || 50 || 21 || 1.1 || 44 || 0.4 || 6.1 || 5.5 || 11.6 || 5.0 || 2.1 || 4.4 || 0
|-
! scope="row" style="text-align:center" | 2020
|style="text-align:center;"|
| 12 || 17 || 12 || 7 || 68 || 79 || 147 || 47 || 21 || 54 || 0.7 || 0.4 || 4.0 || 4.6 || 8.6 || 2.8 || 1.2 || 3.2 || 2
|- style="background-color: #EAEAEA"
! scope="row" style="text-align:center" | 2021
|style="text-align:center;"|
| 12 || 6 || 3 || 4 || 26 || 27 || 53 || 23 || 17 || 23 || 0.5 || 0.7 || 4.3 || 4.5 || 8.8 || 3.8 || 2.8 || 3.8 || 0
|-
! scope="row" style="text-align:center" | 2022
|style="text-align:center;"|
| 12 || 0 || – || – || – || – || – || – || – || – || – || – || – || – || – || – || – || – || –
|-
|- class="sortbottom"
! colspan=3| Career
! 143
! 100
! 66
! 728
! 656
! 1384
! 503
! 260
! 0.7
! 0.5
! 5.1
! 4.6
! 9.7
! 3.5
! 1.8
! 5
|}

Notes

References

External links

1992 births
Living people
Gold Coast Football Club players
Australian rules footballers from South Australia